Baby Boy may refer to:

Music
"Baby Boy" (Mary Kay Place song), a 1976 song by Mary Kay Place
"Baby Boy" (Me & My song), a 1995 song by Me & My
"Baby Boy" (Big Brovaz song), a 2002 song by Big Brovaz
"Baby Boy" (Beyoncé song), a 2003 song by Beyoncé featuring Sean Paul
"Baby Boy", a 1969 song by Fred Hughes
"Baby Boy", a song by C. Jérôme from his 1974 album Baby Boy
"Baby Boy", a song by Status Quo from their 1977 album Rockin' All Over the World
"Baby Boy", a song by Whigfield from her 1997 album Whigfield II
"Baby Boy", a song by Massive Attack featuring Thea from the 2004 soundtrack for Danny the Dog
"Baby Boy", a song by For King & Country that featured on their Into the Silent Night: The EP

Other uses
Baby Boy (film), a 2001 film by John Singleton and its soundtrack album
Baby Boy or Charlie Haggers, a character on Mary Hartman, Mary Hartman

See also
Baby Boy da Prince (born 1983), American rapper